A qubba (pl.  qubāb), also transliterated as ḳubba, kubbet and koubba, is a cupola or domed structure, typically a tomb or shrine in Islamic architecture. In many regions, such as North Africa, the term qubba commonly the tomb of a local wali (local Muslim saint) or marabout, and usually consists of a chamber covered by a dome or pyramidal cupola.

Etymology 
The Arabic word qubba was originally used to mean a tent of hides, or generally the assembly of a material such as cloth into a circle. It's likely that this original meaning was extended to denote domed buildings after the latter had developed in Islamic architecture. It is now also used generally for tomb sites if they are places of pilgrimage. In Turkish and Persian the word kümbet, kumbad, or gunbād has a similar meaning for dome or domed tomb.

Historical development 

A well-known example of an Islamic domed shrine is the Dome of the Rock, known in Arabic as Qubbat al-Sakhrah, although this particular monumental example is exceptional in early Islamic architecture. In early Islamic culture, the construction of mausoleums and ostentations tomb structures to commemorate the deceased was viewed as unorthodox, as Muhammad himself opposed such practices. However, historical records indicate that from the 8th century onward mausoleums became common, propagated in part by their popularity among the Shi'a, who built tombs to commemorate the Imams which in turn became places of religious ceremony and pilgrimage. The oldest surviving example of a domed tomb in Islamic architecture is the Qubbat al-Sulaibiyya in Samarra, present-day Iraq, dating from the mid-9th century. The construction of domed tombs became more common among both Shi'as and Sunnis during the tenth century, although early Sunni mausoleums were mostly built for political rulers. An example of the latter is the Samanid Mausoleum in Bukhara, present-day Uzbekistan, built in the tenth century.

In Yazidism 
Yazidi shrines and sacred buildings typically have conical spires that are known as qubbe in Kurdish.

See also
 History of medieval Arabic and Western European domes
 Maqam (shrine), regional term: wali or weli
 Mazar (mausoleum)
 Islamic pilgrimage
 Türbe, Ottoman mausoleums
 Gonbad

References

Citations

Bibliography

 
 
 . (subscription required)
   

Islamic architecture
Islamic shrines